The stripe-headed rhabdornis or  stripe-headed creeper (Rhabdornis mystacalis), also known as the stripe-sided rhabdornis, is a species of bird currently placed in the  starling family, Sturnidae. It is endemic to the Philippines.

References

External links 
eBird Website

stripe-headed rhabdornis
stripe-headed rhabdornis
Taxonomy articles created by Polbot